Events in the year 2018 in Serbia.

Incumbents
 President: Aleksandar Vučić
 Prime Minister: Ana Brnabić

Events

4 March – scheduled time for the Belgrade City Assembly election, 2018

Deaths

1 January – Dušan Mitošević, footballer (b. 1949).

12 April – Zoran Krasić, politician (b. 1956)

References

 
2010s in Serbia
Years of the 21st century in Serbia
Serbia
Serbia